Bharoke Cheema also spell as Bharoki Cheema, is a town and Union Council in Wazirabad Tehsil, Gujranwala District, Punjab, Pakistan.

See also

 Gujranwala
 Wazirabad

References

Cities and towns in Gujranwala District
Populated places in Wazirabad Tehsil
Union councils of Wazirabad Tehsil